East Bengal Club is an Indian association football club based in Kolkata, West Bengal, which competes in the top tier of Indian football, for the 2022–23 season. The club was formed when the vice-president of Jorabagan, Suresh Chandra Chaudhuri, resigned when Jorabagan sent out their starting eleven but with the notable exclusion of defender Sailesh Bose who was dropped from the squad for reasons not disclosed when they were about to face Mohun Bagan in the Coochbehar Cup Semi-Final on 28 July 1920. He along with Raja Manmatha Nath Chaudhuri, Ramesh Chandra Sen, and Aurobinda Ghosh, formed East Bengal, in the Jorabagan home of Suresh Chandra on 1 August 1920; 99 years ago. East Bengal started playing in the Calcutta Football League 2nd division from 1921 and in 1925 they qualified for the first division for the first time and since then they have won numerous titles in Indian Football.

East Bengal joined the National Football League since its inception in 1996 and is the only club to play all seasons till date, even after its name change to I-League in 2007. East Bengal have won the National Football League thrice: 2000–01, 2002–03 and 2003–04 and became runners up 7 times, the most number of times by any Indian football club. Among other trophies, East Bengal has won the Calcutta Football League 39 times, the IFA Shield 28 times, the Federation Cup 8 times and the Durand Cup 16 times.

The team that East Bengal have met the most in I-League (formerly National Football League) competition is Mohun Bagan, their arch-rivals, against whom they have contested 45 league matches having won 17 of these; Mohun Bagan are the side against whom East Bengal has won the most in league competition. Churchill Brothers have recorded the most league victories over East Bengal, with 16 wins in 42 matches.

In 2020–21 season, East Bengal moved into the Indian Super League, the officially declared new top tier league of Indian football, after a successful bid process. They finished ninth in their debut season, having won three of the twenty league matches. The team finished eleventh, at the bottom in the 2021–22 season, winning just one game in the entire campaign. In the 2022–23 season, East Bengal finished ninth again, having won six of the twenty league matches.

All-time league record

Indian Super League

League record by ISL season

League record by opponents

Overall record in ISL

National Football League/I-League

League record by NFL/I-League season
<onlyinclude>

{| class="wikitable" style="font-size:90%; width:70%; text-align:center"
|-
|+East Bengal league record in NFL/I-League
|-
!Season!!Played!!Won!!Draw!!Loss!!GF!!GA!!GD!!Points!!Position!!Ref
|-
| rowspan="2"|1996–97 || 5 || 3 || 2 || 0 || 6 || 2 || +4 || 11 || Qualify for Championship stage
| rowspan="2"|
|-
| 14 || 7 || 4 || 3 || 19 || 11 || +8 || 25 || 3rd
|-
| 1997–98 || 18 || 8 || 7 || 3 || 18 || 10 || +8 || 31  2nd
|
|-
| rowspan="2"|1998–99 || 10 || 8 || 2 || 0 || 19 || 2 || +17 || 26 || Qualify for Second Stage
| rowspan="2"|
|-
| 10 || 5 || 4 || 1 || 14 || 8 || +6 || 19  2nd
|-
| 1999–00 || 22 || 8 || 8 || 6 || 25 || 21 || +4 || 32 || 7th
|
|-
| 2000–01 || 22 || 13 || 7 || 2 || 30 || 9 || +21 || 46 Champions
|
|-
| 2001–02 || 22 || 11 || 3 || 8 || 31 || 23 || +8 || 36 || 5th
|
|-
| 2002–03 || 22 || 15 || 4 || 3 || 44 || 22 || +22 || 49 Champions
|
|-
| 2003–04 || 22 || 15 || 4 || 3 || 37 || 13 || +24 || 49 Champions
|
|-
| 2004–05 || 22 || 13 || 4 || 5 || 34 || 16 || +18 || 43 || 3rd
|
|-
| 2005–06 || 17 || 9 || 4 || 4 || 25 || 16 || +9 || 31  2nd
|
|-
| 2006–07 || 18 || 7 || 5 || 6 || 29 || 29 || 0 || 26 || 5th
|
|-
| 2007–08 || 18 || 5 || 4 || 9 || 17 || 23 || -6 || 19 || 6th
|
|-
| 2008–09 || 22 || 7 || 7 || 8 || 31 || 26 || +5 || 28 || 6th
|
|-
| 2009–10 || 26 || 7 || 10 || 9 || 27 || 31 || -4 || 31 || 9th
|
|-
| 2010–11 || 26 || 15 || 6 || 5 || 44 || 21 || +23 || 51  2nd
|
|-
| 2011–12 || 26 || 15 || 6 || 5 || 46 || 22 || +24 || 51  2nd
|
|-
| 2012–13 || 26 || 13 || 8 || 5 || 44 || 18 || +26 || 47 || 3rd
|
|-
| 2013–14 || 24 || 12 || 7 || 5 || 39 || 23 || +16 || 43  2nd
|
|-
| 2014–15 || 20 || 8 || 5 || 7 || 30 || 28 || +2 || 29 || 4th
|
|-
| 2015–16 || 16 || 7 || 4 || 5 || 22 || 18 || +4 || 25 || 3rd
|
|-
| 2016–17 || 18 || 10 || 3 || 5 || 33 || 15 || +18 || 33 || 3rd
|
|-
| 2017–18 || 18 || 8 || 7 || 3 || 32 || 19 || +13 || 31 || 4th
|
|-
| 2018–19 || 20 || 13 || 3 || 4 || 37 || 20 || +17 || 42  2nd
|
|-
| 2019–20 || 16 || 6 || 5 || 5 || 23 || 18 || +4 || 20 2nd
|
|-
| TOTAL || 500 || 248 || 133 || 119 || 756 || 464 || +292 || 877 
!scope="col"|
|}

League record by opponents
 Statistics correct till end of 2019-20 I-League.

Overall record
 Statistics correct till end of 2019-20 I-League.

Notes

See also 

 Indian Super League
 I-League
 National Football League

References

League Record By Opponent
East Bengal
Association football league records by opponent